Bo Jesper Svensson (born 14 March 1996) is a Swedish professional golfer.

Early life and amateur career
Svensson was born in Uppsala, Sweden. As a junior golfer, he won both the Swedish Junior Matchplay Championship at Vasatorp Golf Club, and the Swedish Junior Strokeplay Championship at Sollentuna Golf Club. 

He represented Sweden at the European Amateur Team Championship in 2017 and 2018, and played in the Duke of York Young Champions Trophy at Royal Aberdeen Golf Club in Scotland, where he finished 13th overall. He placed third at the 2015 Campenato de Castellón in Spain.

Svensson played college golf at Campbell University in Buies Creek, North Carolina, between 2015 and 2019. He majored in Business Administration and was Big South Conference Golfer of the Year in 2017 and 2019. He won four tournaments, including the Big South Championship twice, the first of which he won with a 14-under-par 202 (67-66-69), breaking a 10-year old record of 204 set by Dustin Johnson of Coastal Carolina.

Professional career
Svensson turned professional in the summer of 2019 and joined the Nordic Golf League, where he won the 2020 Race to Himmerland, the season finale in Denmark. In 2021, he was runner-up in the season opener, the Lindbytvätten Grand Opening, and again runner-up at the Stockholm Trophy in June, one stroke behind Jesper Kennegård.

In August 2021, he was runner-up at the Finnish Challenge on the Challenge Tour, two strokes behind winner Marcus Helligkilde of Denmark. The following week, he took a one-stroke lead into day three of the Made in Esbjerg Challenge, another Challenge Tour event, where he ultimately finished T10. The results propelled him into the top 45 of Challenge Tour Rankings, earning exemption in category 3c for the fall tournaments on the tour.

Svensson was again in contention at the Empordà Challenge in Spain. After a run of seven birdies in the final round he was co-leader with Julien Brun at the 16th hole, but a bogey-bogey finish sent him down the leaderboard to a tie for 3rd. The result lifted him to 33rd place in the Challenge Tour Rankings, approaching a spot in the top 20 that secures a European Tour card for 2022, with two tournaments left of the season.

Svensson finished the 2021 Challenge Tour season ranked 36th on the Order of Merit, enable him a few starts on the 2022 European Tour, from that season named the DP World Tour.

Amateur wins
2014 Swedish Junior Matchplay Championship, Skandia Tour Riks #4, Titleist FootJoy Junior Open
2015 Skandia Tour Elit #2
2016 Swedish Junior Strokeplay Championship
2017 Big South Championship
2018 Golfweek Program Challenge, Old Dominion OBX Collegiate
2019 Big South Championship 
Sources:

Professional wins (1)

Nordic Golf League wins (1)

Source:

Team appearances
Amateur
European Amateur Team Championship (representing Sweden): 2017, 2018

References

External links

Swedish male golfers
Campbell Fighting Camels golfers
Sportspeople from Uppsala
1996 births
Living people